Henryk Jagodziński (25 November 1925 – 6 January 2002) was a Polish rower. He competed at the 1952 Summer Olympics and the 1956 Summer Olympics.

References

1925 births
2002 deaths
Polish male rowers
Olympic rowers of Poland
Rowers at the 1952 Summer Olympics
Rowers at the 1956 Summer Olympics
People from Będzin
Sportspeople from Silesian Voivodeship